The Apple Silentype is Apple Computer, Inc.'s first printer, announced in 1979 and released in March 1980 for US$599, shortly after the Apple II Plus. The Silentype's firmware was written by Andy Hertzfeld, who later worked on the Apple Macintosh. The Silentype is a thermal printer, which uses a special paper and provides 80-column output. It was also compatible with the Apple III.  

The Silentype's many dramatic advantages over other printers at the time, including silent operation, very small size, print speed and reliability, were especially well-suited for its use in the nascent point-of-sale and hospitality industries. The Silentype was the first printer to be used in any restaurant as a point-of-sale remote requisition printer to speed service. The broadening use of printers in the hospitality industry subsequently played a key role in the advancement of efficiency throughout the hospitality industry worldwide. The typical point-of-sale hospitality printer in use today, forty years later, is a thermal printer that still mimics the way the Silentype was used when it was introduced in 1980.

References

External links 
 MyOldMac.net – Apple Silentype printer information

Apple Inc. printers
Products introduced in 1980